The Globe Unity Orchestra is a free jazz ensemble.

Globe Unity was formed in autumn 1966 with a commission received by Alexander von Schlippenbach from the Berlin Jazz Festival. It had its debut at the Berliner Philharmonie on 3 November combining Gunter Hampel's quartet with Manfred Schoof' s quintet and Peter Brötzmann's trio: Hampel (bcl, fl); Willem Breuker (bs, ss); Schoof (tp) with Gerd Dudek (ts); Alexander von Schlippenbach (p); Buschi Niebergall (b) and Jaki Liebezeit (d) on one side, Brötzmann (saxophones), Peter Kowald (b, tuba), Sven-Åke Johansson (d) on the other.

During the next years this core group was completed by other European and American musicians: Johannes Bauer (tb), Anthony Braxton (as, cl), Willem Breuker (ts), Rüdiger Carl (as, ts), Günter Christmann (tb), Gunter Hampel (bcl), Toshinori Kondo (tp), Steve Lacy (ss), Paul Lovens (drums), Paul Lytton (drums), Albert Mangelsdorff (tb), Evan Parker (ss, ts), Michel Pilz (bcl, cl, bars), Ernst-Ludwig Petrowsky (as, cl, fl), Enrico Rava (tp), Paul Rutherford (tb), Heinz Sauer (ss, ts), Bob Stewart (tuba), Tomasz Stańko (tp), and Kenny Wheeler (tp).

The Orchestra has been described as providing "the most remarkable assemblies of outside jazz talent since the AACM big bands".

They performed in New Delhi, India for the Jazz Yatra in late 1970s. They performed at the Ashoka Hotel, New Delhi in 1978. 

The final concert in the group's main lifetime was at the Chicago Jazz Festival in 1987.

The 40th anniversary line-up for the 2006 concerts and recordings were the saxophone players Evan Parker, Ernst-Ludwig Petrowsky, Gerd Dudek, Rudi Mahall (bcl), the trumpets Kenny Wheeler, Manfred Schoof, Axel Dörner, Jean-Luc Cappozzo and trombonists Paul Rutherford, George E. Lewis, Jeb Bishop, J. Bauer) with Alexander von Schlippenbach (p), and drummers Paul Lovens and Paul Lytton.

Discography
 Live in Wuppertal (FMP, 1973)
 Globe Unity/Sun (MPS 1975)
 Evidence Vol. 1 (FMP, 1976)
 Into the Valley Vol. 2 (FMP, 1976)
 Jahrmarkt/Local Fair (Po Torch, 1977)
 Improvisations (Japo, 1978)
 Hamburg '74 (FMP, 1979)
 Compositions (Japo, 1980)
 Intergalactic Blow (Japo, 1983)
 20th Anniversary (FMP, 1993)
 Globe Unity 67 & 70 (Atavistic, 2001)
 Globe Unity 2002 (Intakt, 2003)
 Globe Unity 40 Years (Intakt, 2007)
 Globe Unity 50 Years (Intakt, 2018)

See also
List of experimental big bands

References

Free jazz ensembles
Experimental big bands
Avant-garde jazz ensembles
FMP/Free Music Production artists
Atavistic Records artists
MPS Records artists
Intakt Records artists